Charles Francis Meade (born 25 February 1881  – died 1975) was an English mountaineer and author.

Origins
Born in England, Meade was the only surviving child of the Hon. Sir Robert Henry Meade and Caroline Georgiana Grenfell. His mother died shortly after his birth and his father before he reached the age of 17.

Climbing
Meade climbed extensively in the Alps and the Himalayas, often accompanied by his guide, Pierre Blanc (d. 1966). In particular, he made a number of early attempts on Kamet, camping overnight in 1913 at Meade’s Col, at a height of 7,138 metres. He was an original member of the Mount Everest Committee. Meade Nunatak, a hill in the Antarctic, is also named after him.

Meade also developed the Meade tent, a design which was extensively used by other climbers for a number of years and at the highest camp on the first ascent of Everest.

Personal life
Meade married Aileen Hilda Brodrick, the daughter of St.John Brodrick (later Earl of Midleton), by whom he had three daughters and a son. They lived in Wales, at Pen-y-Lan, near Meifod.

Publications
 Approach to the Hills (John Murray, London, 1940)
 High Mountains (Harvill, London, 1954)

References

English mountain climbers
English writers
1881 births
1975 deaths
20th-century English writers